The Marino Selo camp was a makeshift prison camp located on the premises of the fishing hut in the village of Marino Selo where Croatian Serb civilians were detained, tortured and killed by members of the 76th Independent Battalion Croatian National Guard (ZNG).

Background

In 1990, following the electoral defeat of the government of the Socialist Republic of Croatia by the Croatian Democratic Union (HDZ), ethnic tensions between Croats and Serbs worsened. The self-styled  Republic of Serb Krajina (RSK) declared its intention to secede from Croatia and join the Republic of Serbia while the Government of the Republic of Croatia declared it a rebellion. In June 1991 Croatia declared independence from Yugoslavia. Tensions eventually broke out into full-scale war, which lasted until 1995.

Camp and crimes
At the end of 1991, members of the military police of the 76th Independent Battalion of the ZNG opened an improvised prison at the fishing hut location, in which they mentally and physically abused Serbs. At least 24 civilians had passed through the prison, and 17 had died as a result of the abuse. The camp was operational between November 1991 and February 1992.

Trials
Six Croatian policemen were indicted for the crimes. On 13 March 2009 after the completion of their trial, The Požega County Court delivered a first instance court verdict that found all six guilty of war crimes: Damir Kufner, Davor Šimić, Pavao Vancaš, Tomica Poletto, Željko Tutić and Antun Ivezić. On 23 March 2010, the Supreme Court quashed the verdict of the Požega County Court War Crimes Council because of procedural omissions and transferred the case to the Osijek County Court. In 2011, the Osijek County Court sentenced Poletto to 15 years, Tutić to 12 years in prison, and released the others.

References

Internment camps in Croatia
History of the Serbs of Croatia
Croatian war crimes in the Croatian War of Independence
Croatian concentration camps in the Yugoslav Wars